Samuel Simeon Fels (February 16, 1860 in Yanceyville, North Carolina – June 23, 1950 in Philadelphia, Pennsylvania) was an American businessman and philanthropist.

Biography
Born to a Jewish family in Yanceyville, North Carolina, Fels family relocated to Philadelphia, where Samuel's older brother Joseph Fels founded a soap manufacturing company, Fels & Co., which found success with the product Fels-Naptha. Samuel became the company's first president, a post he held until his death at age 90.

Philanthropy 
An active philanthropist, in 1936, Fels established the Samuel S. Fels Fund, which provides support to Philadelphia-area non-profit organizations. Fels also founded the University of Pennsylvania’s Fels Institute of Government.

Fels is known for commissioning Samuel Barber's Violin Concerto Op. 14 in 1939.

In 1912, Henry H. Goddard dedicated his book on eugenics The Kallikak Family to Fels: "who made this study and who has followed the work from its incipiency with kindly criticism and advice".

References

External links
Fels Institute of Government, University of Pennsylvania
The Fels Planetarium at The Franklin Institute
The Samuel S. Fels Fund
Fels Longitudinal Study
Iso Briselli, the adopted son of Samuel S. Fels

The Samuel Simeon Fels Papers, including correspondence, records and other materials, are available for research use at the Historical Society of Pennsylvania.

1860 births
1950 deaths
American philanthropists
Central High School (Philadelphia) alumni
University of Pennsylvania people
People from Yanceyville, North Carolina
Businesspeople from Philadelphia
American business executives
American people of German-Jewish descent
American eugenicists